Lindfield & High Weald is an electoral division of West Sussex in the United Kingdom, and returns one member to sit on West Sussex County Council.

Extent
The division covers the villages of Horsted Keynes, Lindfield, Scaynes Hill, Sharpthorne and West Hoathly.

It comprises the following Mid Sussex District wards: High Weald Ward and Lindfield Ward; and the following civil parishes: Horsted Keynes, Lindfield, Lindfield Rural and West Hoathly.

Election results

2013 Election
Results of the election held on 2 May 2013:

2009 Election
Results of the election held on 4 June 2009:

2005 Election
Results of the election held on  5 May 2005:

References
Election Results - West Sussex County Council

External links
 West Sussex County Council
 Election Maps

Electoral Divisions of West Sussex